Stanislav Vladimirovich Zakharov (born 31 August 1981) is a Russian former pair skater. He is the 2002 World Junior champion with partner Elena Riabchuk. In the summer of 2000, his blade struck Riabchuk during a side-by-side spin, putting her in hospital for a couple of weeks.

Results

With Riabchuk

With Potanina

Programs 
(with Riabchuk)

References

External links 
 
 Pairs on Ice profile

Navigation

Russian male pair skaters
Living people
1981 births
World Junior Figure Skating Championships medalists
People from Odintsovo
Sportspeople from Moscow Oblast